Kostyantyn Mykhaylovych Cherniy (born 17 August 1992) is a Ukrainian professional footballer who plays as a centre-forward for Polish club KSZO Ostrowiec Świętokrzyski.

References

External links
 Profile on Obolon Kyiv official website
 
 

1992 births
Living people
People from Nova Kakhovka
Sportspeople from Kherson Oblast
Ukrainian footballers
Association football forwards
FC Mariupol players
FC Illichivets-2 Mariupol players
FC Stal Kamianske players
FC Enerhiya Nova Kakhovka players
FC Kremin Kremenchuk players
FC Naftovyk-Ukrnafta Okhtyrka players
FC Hirnyk-Sport Horishni Plavni players
Valmieras FK players
FC Metalurh Zaporizhzhia players
FC Kryvbas Kryvyi Rih players
FC Obolon-Brovar Kyiv players
Polonia Przemyśl players
KSZO Ostrowiec Świętokrzyski players
Ukrainian First League players
Ukrainian Second League players
Latvian Higher League players
IV liga players
III liga players
Ukrainian expatriate footballers
Ukrainian expatriate sportspeople in Latvia
Expatriate footballers in Latvia
Ukrainian expatriate sportspeople in Poland
Expatriate footballers in Poland